Perrystown is a suburb in South Dublin, Ireland. It is in the Dublin 12 postal district and is adjacent to the areas of Crumlin, Greenhills, Kimmage, Templeogue, Terenure, and Walkinstown.

Location and transport 

Perrystown lies just north of the River Poddle, six kilometres east-northeast of the river's source.

The district is directly serviced by the 15A and 150 bus routes. The 9, 17, 54A, and 83 bus routes all serve Perrystown's surrounding areas.

The closest light rail link is Kylemore Luas Stop on the Naas Road. There is no mainline train service.

Services 

The local primary school is St. Damian's, and the area's Roman Catholic parish church is the Church of the Holy Spirit, Kimmage Manor.

The Ashleaf Shopping Centre is to the north of Perrystown, containing a Dunnes Stores and several other small outlets. There is another shopping area, including the Perrystown Post Office, on Whitehall Road West. 

There are two pubs in the area – The Laurels gastropub on Whitehall Road West and The Pines café bar and restaurant on Whitehall Road.

Sport 

The local community centre hosts the PME Variety Group, Robert Emmet's GAA Club, and Manortown United Football Club.

There is a large badminton centre, the Terenure Badminton Centre, on Whitehall Road. In 2018 and 2019, the bar upstairs in this badminton centre served as the sole Irish venue for the World Quizzing Championship, an individual event that is held simultaneously in many countries around the world for one day each year, normally in June.

The cyclists competing in Stage 1 of the 1998 Tour de France (which started in Ireland that year) passed within 100 yards of the village of Perrystown during this stage (Greentrees Road - Willington Roundabout - Templeville Road) on the way to 1987 Tour de France winner Stephen Roche's hometown of Dundrum in Dublin, and finished back in Dublin City Centre via County Wicklow to complete the stage.

Local government and politics 
Perrystown is within the administrative area of South Dublin County Council, in the Rathfarnham-Templeogue local electoral area. It closely shares a border with Dublin City, and is in the Dublin South Central Dáil constituency.

Notable people
 Sonny Knowles, showband singer.
 Niall Quinn, former Ireland football international.
Anthony Stokes, Ireland football international

See also
 List of towns and villages in Ireland

References

Crumlin, Dublin
Uppercross